The FAI Cup 1922–23 was the second edition of Ireland's premier cup competition, The Football Association of Ireland Challenge Cup or FAI Cup. The tournament began on 6 January 1923 and concluded on 17 March with the final held at Dalymount Park, Dublin. An official attendance of 14,000 people watched Belfast side Alton United of the Falls League defeat Shelbourne 1-0. The Falls League's affiliation to the FAI, rather than the IFA, allowed the club to compete in the cup.

First round

Second round

Semi-finals

Final

Notes
A.  From 1923-1936, the FAI Cup was known as the Free State Cup.

B.  Attendances were calculated using gate receipts which limited their accuracy as a large proportion of people, particularly children, attended football matches in Ireland throughout the 20th century for free by a number of means.

C.  The FAI applied to join FIFA in 1923 and was admitted as the FAIFS (Football Association of the Irish Free State).

D.  Fixture abandoned during 2nd half due to bad light. Re-Fixture played on 13 January.

References
Specific

General

External links
FAI Website

 
FAI Cup seasons
FAI
FAI Cup